The Richmond Black Widows are a women's American football team playing out of Richmond, Virginia. They are a member of the Women's Football Alliance (WFA).  They are the first women's football team in Richmond, and currently the only team in Virginia.  They played their inaugural season in April 2016. 

For the 2022 season, Richmond Black Widows' games are held at Hermitage High School.

Staff
As of the 2022 season the coaching staff include: 
Head coach - Frank Baltimore Sr.
Offensive Coordinator - Reggie Crosby
Defensive Coordinator - Paul Nuttall
Defensive Line Coach - Marlene Davis
Assistant coach - Anne Dornek
LB Coach - Larry Jones
QB/RB/WR Coach - Mike Jones
DB Coach - Saroun Sam
Offensive Line Coach - Sarah Schkeeper

History

Women's Football in Richmond
The Richmond Black Widows was founded in 2015 by Sarah Schkeeper with the express goal of, not only promoting women's football in the area, but providing young girls and women the opportunity to play a sport they have been denied and growing the confidence of young girls by showing them what can be achieved with drive and determination.
At least once, prior to Sarah Schkeeper founding the Richmond Black Widows, a women's football team was attempted in Richmond.  It fizzled before it ever started a season.  Having played for 5 years for the New York Sharks and competing in 2013 on the US Women's National Team that participated in the IFAF Women's World Championship, Schkeeper moved to Richmond, Virginia and started the journey of bringing women's football to Richmond, Virginia.

As there was no foundation for football in the area, Sarah Schkeeper had to use alternative means to spread the word, creating a MeetUp group.  Currently the team has a strong roster of over 40 women and a knowledgeable coaching staff.

Season-By-Season

|-
| colspan="6" align="center" | Richmond Black Widows (WFA)
|-
|2016 || 5 || 3 || 0 || -- ||Tier III National Conference Champions
|-

!Totals || 6 || 3 || 0
|colspan="2"| (including playoffs)

* = current standing

Roster

2016

Season schedule

References

External links
 

Women's Football Alliance teams
Sports in Richmond, Virginia
American football teams established in 2015
2015 establishments in Virginia
Women's sports in Virginia